is a retired Nippon Professional Baseball player. He played for the Hokkaido Nippon-Ham Fighters, Yomiuri Giants, Chiba Lotte Marines and Chunichi Dragons over a 14-year professional career.

External links

NPB

Living people
1981 births
People from Kuroishi, Aomori
Baseball people from Aomori Prefecture
Japanese baseball players
Nippon Professional Baseball outfielders
Hokkaido Nippon-Ham Fighters players
Yomiuri Giants players
Chiba Lotte Marines players
Chunichi Dragons players
Japanese baseball coaches
Nippon Professional Baseball coaches
Aomori University alumni